Catherine Merri "Katie" Pavlich (born July 10, 1988) is an American conservative commentator, author, blogger, and podcaster.

Early life and education

Pavlich was born in Phoenix, Arizona, to a family of Croat and German descent. She grew up in the mountainous areas of northern Arizona, where she developed interests in outdoor activities such as river rafting and hunting. Pavlich graduated from Sinagua High School in Flagstaff, where she played volleyball and basketball.

In 2010, Pavlich earned a bachelor of arts degree in broadcast journalism from the University of Arizona. As an adult woman with eligible ancestry, she became a member of the Daughters of the American Revolution.

Career

Pavlich moved to the Washington, D.C., area and became news editor for Townhall.com, a contributing editor to Townhall Magazine, and a Fox News contributor. In the summer of 2013, she became an alternate co-host for The Five, a panel talk show on the Fox News Channel. She was also a National Review Washington Fellow. Pavlich has appeared on media outlets including Fox News, CNN, MSNBC, CNBC, and Fox Business. Starting in 2018, she co-hosted the podcast Everything's Going to Be All Right with former White House Press Secretary Sean Spicer.

The Conservative Political Action Conference named her 2013 Blogger of the Year. The Clare Boothe Luce Policy Institute gave her the 2014 Woman of the Year Award, and the 2013 Conservative Leadership Award.

She authored the books Fast and Furious: Barack Obama's Bloodiest Scandal and Its Shameless Cover-Up (2012) and Assault & Flattery: The Truth About the Left and Their War on Women (2014).

Political punditry
On the March 19, 2019, broadcast of the Fox News show Outnumbered, Pavlich said that America was the first country to end slavery within 150 years, and receives no credit for it. The remark was disputed by PolitiFact, which noted that countries that outlawed slavery earlier and more quickly than the U.S. included El Salvador, Mexico, Chile, Argentina and Venezuela. In a reversal, she later said she had misspoken, meaning to say that America was "one of" the first countries to end slavery within 150 years "from the point of its founding".

In September 2019, she questioned Greta Thunberg's global warming activism, saying "She claims that there needs to be more information about the quote 'science,' but actually on the other side there needs to be more information about the hundreds of scientists who actually disagree with the projections of climate change."

References

External links 

 
 
 

1988 births
21st-century American non-fiction writers
21st-century American women writers
American columnists
American people of Croatian descent
American people of German descent
American political commentators
American political writers
American social commentators
Daughters of the American Revolution people
Fox News people
Journalists from Arizona
Living people
People from Flagstaff, Arizona
University of Arizona alumni
American women columnists
Conservatism in the United States